Illinbah is a rural locality in the Scenic Rim Region, Queensland, Australia.

Geography 
Illinbah occupies a section of the valley along the upper Coomera River.

History
The average age of the Illinbah population was 42 years of age, 5 years above the Australian median of 37.  73.9% of people living in Illinbah were born in Australia. The other top responses for country of birth were England 6.4%, New Zealand 6.4%, Germany 1.9%, Canada 1%, Czech Republic 1%.  89.8% of people spoke only English at home; the next most common languages were 1.6% Japanese, 1.3% Croatian, 1.3% Spanish, 1% German.

Education 
There are no schools in Illinbah. The nearest government primary school is Canungra State School in Canungra to the north. The nearest government secondary school is Tamborine Mountain State High School in Tamborine Mountain to the north.

Attractions 
Cooginbano Lookout is within the Lamington National Park. It offers views over the Coomera River valley.

References 

Scenic Rim Region
Localities in Queensland